Edzard Koning (3 May 1869 – 21 February 1954) was a Dutch painter. His work was part of the painting event in the art competition at the 1936 Summer Olympics. Koning's work was included in the 1939 exhibition and sale Onze Kunst van Heden (Our Art of Today) at the Rijksmuseum in Amsterdam. His elder brother, Arnold Hendrik Koning, was also a painter.

References

1869 births
1954 deaths
20th-century Dutch painters
Dutch male painters
Olympic competitors in art competitions
People from Winschoten
20th-century Dutch male artists